The Angelici were an obscure heretical sect of the 3rd century.

Name
Epiphanius states that little is known of the sect, and conjectures that the name either comes from them possibly holding a belief that angels created the world, or else that they believed that they were so pure as to be angels. Citing Epiphanius, and expanding, St. Augustine supposes they are called Angelici because of an extravagant worship of angels, and such as tended to idolatry.

Beliefs
Epiphanius states that he is entirely ignorant as to what the core tenets of the sect are.

References

Citations

Books

References

Christian denominations established in the 3rd century
Heresy in Christianity